Rochefort-du-Gard is a commune in the Gard department in southern France.

Population

Culture
Rochefort-du-Gard is integrated into Occitanie but naturally rooted in Provence. It depends on the economic area of Avignon.

With its 42 associations, it enjoys a great number of cultural and sporting events. Nearly 3000 people come to see the "Grand Aïoli," held on the Monday after the village festival.

Wine
Rochefort-du-Gard is well-renowned for its AOC Côtes-du-Rhône-Villages Signargues, one of the  best appellation of the southern part of the Rhône Valley. The different soils, micro-climates and vines provide an ideal habitat for this prestigious appellation. Everything was set in motion to achieve optimum results: full-bodied wines combining force and elegance yet retaining the uniqueness of terroir through a complex pallet of aromas.

Sights
Rochefort-du-Gard is well known for its well-preserved historic monuments:
 Le Castelas, a fully renovated Romanesque chapel from the tenth century, which towers above the village
 The Sanctuary of Notre Dame, built under Charlemagne's rule in 798. The chapel, the nave, the choir, the baroque altar, the museum of thanksgiving plaques, the hall of echoes, and the Grand Calvary are all worth the visit
 The church of Saint Bardulphe, a neo-Gothic parish church which was renovated in 1981 and 1988
 The town hall, a former chapel built from 1729 to 1934
 The wash-house with its Doric columns. It was completed in 1807 and entirely renovated in 1999

See also
Communes of the Gard department

References

External links

 https://www.ville-rochefortdugard.fr/

Communes of Gard